Pierre-Yves Dermagne (born 30 December 1980) is a Belgian politician. , he serves as Minister of Economy and Employment in the De Croo Government led by Prime Minister Alexander De Croo. He is affiliated with the Socialist Party (Parti Socialiste). He won the 2018 communal elections in Rochefort with 2,109 votes over François Bellot. In October 2021, he advocated for a reduction in the work week from five days a week to four.

References 

Living people
1980 births
Place of birth missing (living people)
Government ministers of Belgium
Socialist Party (Belgium) politicians